The 1943 North Carolina Tar Heels football team represented the University of North Carolina at Chapel Hill during the 1943 college football season. The Tar Heels were led by first-year head coach Tom Young and played their home games at Kenan Memorial Stadium. They competed as a member of the Southern Conference.

Schedule

References

North Carolina
North Carolina Tar Heels football seasons
North Carolina Tar Heels football